Elgton Torrance Jenkins Jr. (born December 26, 1995) is an American football guard for the Green Bay Packers of the National Football League (NFL). He played college football at Mississippi State.

Professional career

Jenkins was drafted by the Green Bay Packers with the 44th overall pick in the second round of the 2019 NFL Draft. He signed his four-year rookie contract on May 13, 2019, worth $6.782 million. After entering his rookie season as a backup, Jenkins made his first NFL start on September 22, 2019, in a Week 3 game against the Denver Broncos, replacing an injured Lane Taylor. On 571 pass-blocking snaps this season, Jenkins did not allow a single sack. During the 2020–21 season, he earned his first Pro Bowl nod as a starter.

Jenkins entered the 2021 season as the Packers starting left tackle in place of an injured David Bakhtiari. He started eight games there before suffering a torn ACL in Week 11 of a 34–31 loss to the Minnesota Vikings. The Packers placed him on injured reserve two days later, ending his season.

On December 23, 2022, Jenkins signed a four-year, $68 million contract extension. He was named as an alternate to the 2023 Pro Bowl.

References

External links
Green Bay Packers bio
Mississippi State Bulldogs bio

1995 births
Living people
Sportspeople from Clarksdale, Mississippi
Players of American football from Mississippi
American football offensive guards
Mississippi State Bulldogs football players
Green Bay Packers players
National Conference Pro Bowl players